Warkały  (German Warkallen) is a village in the administrative district of Gmina Jonkowo, within Olsztyn County, Warmian-Masurian Voivodeship, in northern Poland.

The village has a population of 350.

References

Villages in Olsztyn County